George Ripley Bliss (September 4, 1883September 20, 1974) served in the California State Assembly for the 59th, 49th and 39th district from 1929 to 1935. During World War I he also served in the United States Army. Assemblyman also introduced a bill to legalize the segregation of Mexican children, which was later defeated due to the results of the Lemon Grove Incident.

References

United States Army personnel of World War I
Republican Party members of the California State Assembly
1883 births
1974 deaths
20th-century American politicians